Gershayim (Hebrew: , without niqqud ), also occasionally grashayim, is two distinct typographical marks in the Hebrew language. The name literally means "double geresh".

Punctuation mark
Gershayim most commonly refers to the punctuation mark . It is always written before the last letter of the non-inflected form of a word or numeral. It is used in the following ways:

To indicate an acronym.
To indicate a multi-digit Hebrew numeral. For example:  represents 18.
To indicate the names of Hebrew letters, differentiating them from any homographs. Compare  "he sketched an eye" with  "he sketched an ayin".
To indicate Hebrew word roots.
In older texts, to indicate the transliteration of a foreign word. This use corresponds to English's use of italics. For example: in printed works of Rashi, the town of Rashi's birth, Troyes, is spelled .

Cantillation mark

Gershayim is a disjunctive cantillation accent in the Tanakh - ◌֞. It is placed above the stressed syllable, as in וַיִּקַּ֞ח (Genesis 22:3).

Computer encoding

Most keyboards do not have a key for the gershayim. As a result, a quotation mark is often substituted for it.

See also

Hebrew acronyms
Hebrew alphabet
Hebrew diacritics
Hebrew punctuation

References

Hebrew diacritics
Punctuation
Typography